Ronald Gordon MacGilvray (July 20, 1930 - February 11, 2007) was an American professional basketball player. He played collegiately at St. John's and was selected in the 1952 NBA draft by the Rochester Royals.

As a senior in 1951–52, MacGilvray was selected as the Haggerty Award winner, given annually since 1935–36 to the best men's college basketball player in the New York City metropolitan area. He was the seventh winner from St. John's in the award's short history.

In the NBA, he played only one season. As a member of the Milwaukee Hawks, MacGilvray averaged 1.3 points, 1.5 rebounds and 1.9 assists per game in six games played.

References

1930 births
2007 deaths
American men's basketball players
Basketball players from New York (state)
Guards (basketball)
Milwaukee Hawks players
Rochester Royals draft picks
St. John's Red Storm men's basketball players